The London Diamond Bourse is a diamond exchange based in London's Hatton Garden area. As of 2016, it had been trading for 76 years, and with rising property costs in the Hatton Garden area, the bourse was considering a move out of the center of London to a new location in the suburbs.

See also 
 Bharat Diamond Bourse

References

External links 
 

Commodity exchanges in the United Kingdom
Diamond exchanges